The 2014–15 Liga Nacional de Básquet season was the 31st season of the top professional basketball league in Argentina. The regular season started on 29 September 2014 and the defending champions were Peñarol. Quimsa won their first title, defeating Gimnasia Indalo in the finals.

Promotions and relegations
Torneo Nacional de Ascenso Champions from the previous season San Martín de Corrientes and runners-up Ciclista Juninense were promoted. As in the previous season, there were no relegations in this tournament.

Clubs

Regular season

League table

North Conference

South Conference

Playoffs

Reclassification playoffs

Championship playoffs

Clubs in international competitions

Awards

Yearly Awards
Most Valuable Player: Nicolás Aguirre, Quimsa
Best Foreign Player:  Robert Battle, Quimsa
Sixth Man of the Year: Santiago Scala, Gimnasia Indalo / Nicolás Brussino, Regatas Corrientes
Rookie of the Year: Juan Pablo Vaulet, Bahía Basket
Coach of the Year: Silvio Santander, Quimsa
Most Improved Player: Gabriel Deck, Quimsa
All-Tournament Team:
 F Jeremiah Wood, San Martín de Corrientes
 F Sam Clancy Jr., Gimnasia Indalo
 C Federico Aguerre, Gimnasia Indalo
 G Nicolás Aguirre, Quimsa
 G Walter Baxley, Quilmes

References

Liga Nacional de Básquet seasons
   
Argentina